James A. Nixon (born February 2, 1988) is a former American football cornerback. He played college football at California (PA). Nixon was signed by the Arizona Cardinals as an undrafted free agent in 2012. He has also played for the Green Bay Packers.

Professional career

Arizona Cardinals
After going undrafted in the 2012 NFL Draft, Nixon signed with the Arizona Cardinals on April 30, 2012. On August 24, 2012, he was released by the Cardinals.

Green Bay Packers
On September 20, 2012, Nixon was signed to the Green Bay Packers' practice squad, where he spent the rest of his rookie season. He was re-signed by the Packers after the season ended on January 14, 2013. Nixon was released on August 31, 2013, however he was signed to the Packers' practice squad two days later. On October 7, 2013, he was signed from the practice squad to the active roster. Nixon was placed on injured reserve on November 23, 2013 after suffering a knee injury. He was taken off injured reserve on February 2, 2014. Nixon was released by the Packers on May 14, 2014.

Career statistics

NFL
Source: NFL.com

References

External links
 
 California Vulcans bio
 Temple Owls bio
 

1988 births
Living people
Players of American football from New Haven, Connecticut
American football cornerbacks
Temple Owls football players
California Vulcans football players
Arizona Cardinals players
Green Bay Packers players